The 2015 South Carolina Gamecocks football team represented the University of South Carolina in the 2015 NCAA Division I FBS football season. The Gamecocks competed as a member of the Southeastern Conference (SEC) as part of its East Division. The team was led by head coach Steve Spurrier, who was in his eleventh year before his resignation on October 12, 2015; co-offensive coordinator Shawn Elliott took over as interim head coach. They played their home games at Williams-Brice Stadium in Columbia, South Carolina. They finished the season 3–9, 1–7 in SEC play to finish in seventh place in the East division.

Previous season
Projected to win the East Division by many entering the season (as the Gamecocks faced the defending SEC East champion Missouri at home who they'd beaten on the road in 2013), the 2014 South Carolina Gamecocks football team endured a disappointing 2014 regular season, going 6-6 overall and 3-5 against SEC opponents, and finishing in fifth place in their division. The Gamecocks opened the 2014 season against their new inter-division rival, Texas A&M who replaced Arkansas in the SEC's new scheduling formula. South Carolina ranked #9 in the nation entering the game but lost to the #21 Aggies in an upset that ended their NCAA leading 18-game home winning streak. The team won their next two SEC contests over Vanderbilt 48-34 and #6 Georgia 38-35. South Carolina then suffered close losses in their next four games against SEC foes Missouri, Kentucky, Auburn, and Tennessee. The Gamecocks did win their final SEC game in come-from-behind fashion over Florida, but lost to their in-state rival Clemson for the first time since 2008 to close out the season. South Carolina was invited to play in the 2014 Independence Bowl in Shreveport, Louisiana against Miami of the Atlantic Coast Conference. The Gamecocks ended the season with a 24-21 win over the Hurricanes to finish the 2014 season 7-6.

Schedule
South Carolina announced their 2015 football schedule on October 14, 2014. The 2015 schedule consisted of 7 home games, 4 away games and 1 neutral game in the regular season. The Gamecocks hosted SEC foes Florida, Kentucky, LSU, and Vanderbilt, and traveled to Georgia, Missouri, Tennessee, and Texas A&M.

The Gamecocks hosted three of the four non–conference play against UCF, the Citadel and in-state rival Clemson. South Carolina traveled to play North Carolina at a neutral site in Charlotte, North Carolina. The Gamecocks traveled to College Station, Texas, for the first time ever on Halloween. They were set to host LSU at home but the contest was relocated to Baton Rouge as a consequence of severe flooding in Columbia, South Carolina. On October 13, 2015, Steve Spurrier officially announced his resignation as head football coach, and co-offensive coordinator Shawn Elliott was named interim head coach for the remaining games of the season.

The game between South Carolina and LSU was originally scheduled to take place in Columbia.  However, in light of massive flooding in Columbia earlier in the week, the game was moved to Baton Rouge.  The game was still considered a home game for South Carolina
Schedule Source:

Season summary

Florida

References

South Carolina
South Carolina Gamecocks football seasons
South Carolina Gamecocks football